CP-300 was a personal microcomputer produced by Prológica, a computer company located in Brazil, and introduced in 1983.

General information
It was compatible in software and hardware with the American TRS-80 Model III, and could be considered a domestic and cheaper version of the CP-500, since it was supplied with only one cabinet containing the CPU and a "gum" keyboard. The power supply was external to the cabinet.

Data Storage

Audio cables were supplied with the computer for connection with a regular tape recorder.

Accessories

 CP-300 Printer.

Bibliography
 Micro Computador - Curso Básico. Rio de Janeiro: Rio Gráfica, 1984, v. 1, pp. 49–50.
 ABREU, Carlos Alberto C. 77 programas para linha TRS-80. Rio de Janeiro: Microkit, 1985.

References 

Prológica computers 
Computer-related introductions in 1983
Goods manufactured in Brazil
Personal computers
Products introduced in 1983